Oscar Rubén Larrauri (born 19 August 1954) is a racing driver from Argentina.  He participated in 21 Formula One Grands Prix, all with the EuroBrun team, debuting at the 1988 Brazilian Grand Prix. He scored no championship points, only qualifying 8 times.

He was for many years part of Brun Motorsport in sports car racing, and involved in the World Sportscar Championship, IMSA GT Championship, Deutsche Rennsport Meisterschaft, and All Japan Sports Prototype Championship during his career.

Formula One

1988
 
Brun Motorsport formed an alliance with Giampaolo Pavanello's Euroracing team who had previously run the factory backed Alfa Romeo team from 1982-1985. The team became known as EuroBrun and Larrauri was signed to drive for the team alongside 1987 Formula 3000 champion Stefano Modena.

The EuroBrun ER188, powered by the  Cosworth DFZ V8 engine, proved to be one of the slowest cars in its debut season with Larrauri in particular gaining an unwanted reputation as a mobile road block in the René Arnoux mould (i.e. one who rarely used his mirrors and often held up faster cars from lapping him, and even getting in the way during qualifying runs). Larrauri's best finish for the year was a 13th place in Mexico (Rd.4) with his only other finish being a 16th place in Germany (Rd.8). With a lack of results coming, Brun actually looked to replace the Argentine in mid-season, but no driver was available who could fit into the car and Larrauri was retained for the rest of the season.

1989
Larrauri then moved back into sports car racing.

Racing record

Complete European Formula Two Championship results
(key)

Complete World Sportscar Championship results
(key) (Races in bold indicate pole position; races in italics indicate fastest lap)

24 Hours of Le Mans results

Complete Formula One results
(key)

References

External links

1954 births
Living people
People from Rosario Department
Argentine racing drivers
Argentine Formula One drivers
EuroBrun Formula One drivers
24 Hours of Le Mans drivers
FIA European Formula 3 Championship drivers
TC 2000 Championship drivers
Top Race V6 drivers
Turismo Carretera drivers
World Sportscar Championship drivers
Sportspeople from Santa Fe Province